Greg Kihn Again is the second studio album by American singer/songwriter Greg Kihn. It was released by Beserkley in 1977.

Track listing

Personnel
Greg Kihn - guitar, harmonica, vocals
Dave Carpender - guitar, vocals
Larry Lynch - drums, vocals
Steve Wright - bass, vocals

Additional personnel
Robbie Dunbar - guitar on "For You"

Production
Producers: Glen Coloktin, Matthew King Kaufman

References

1977 albums
Greg Kihn albums
Beserkley Records albums